Leopoldo Alejandro Betancourt López (born 1980) is a Venezuelan businessman who is Chairman and CEO of Derwick Associates, an engineering, procurement and construction company. He is the leader of the international investment group O'Hara Administration, and a director of Pacific Exploration & Production Corporation, a publicly held Canadian company and a leading explorer and producer of natural gas and crude oil which operates in various Latin American countries. Betancourt controls 19.95% of Pacific Exploration & Production. He is also president of Hawkers, a Spanish sunglasses company.

Personal life and early career

Education
Betancourt has a double major in Economics and Business Administration from the Suffolk University of Massachusetts, United States.

Early career
Betancourt started his career at a company specializing in the energy sector and in the exploration, production and trade of oil and its derivatives. The company has presence in the U.S., Europe, Middle East, South America and Africa. There, he served as business manager for Latin America.

He later worked at Guruceaga Group, a company dedicated to international trade in goods, finance, real estate and farm, in which he was manager of new business. He also worked at BGB Energy, a company that was responsible for representing, in joint venture with the old GESCA GAS in Venezuela, international corporation Kawasaki Heavy Industries.

Personal life
Betancourt is a descendant of Hermógenes López, the former acting president of Venezuela.

Companies and affiliations

Derwick 
Betancourt is the co-founder, along with Pedro Trebbau López, of  Derwick Associates Corp., a Venezuelan company working in the energy sector. He has also co-founded eponymous companies in Panama, the United States, Spain, and Barbados.

Since it started operations in 2003, the company has obtained eleven contracts for the construction of power plants in Venezuela; five contracts awarded by Electricidad de Caracas (to join Corpoelec in December 2011), five by Petroleos de Venezuela SA (PDVSA negotiated with Bariven, a PDVSA division), and one by Corporación Venezolana de Guayana (CVG).

As co-founder of Derwick Associates, Betancourt has been linked to corruption scandals in Venezuela. Derwick was reportedly awarded government projects despite having limited experience in the electricity sector. Derwick denies the allegations.

Thor Leonardo Halvorssen Mendoza sued Derwick and Betancourt. Banco Banesco and Derwick Associates claimed that the accusations were false; the lawsuit was dismissed.

In January 2014, the business section of the Spanish daily ABC published an interview in which Alejandro Betancourt explained his strategy of turning Derwick into a major technology provider for Latin America.

Pacific Exploration & Production 
In May 2015, O'Hara Administration, an international investment group led by Alejandro Betancourt, became the largest shareholder of the petroleum company Pacific Exploration & Production Corporation by controlling 19.5 percent of its shares.

By the end of August 2015 Betancourt increased his control over the shares of Pacific to 19.95% and was appointed director and member of the board. Betancourt publicly shared plans to expand the operations of the company and enter new markets to grow.

BDK Financial Group
In June 2015 the BDK Financial Group, of which Alejandro Betancourt is a major shareholder, inaugurated the Banque de Dakar headquarters in Senegal. The objective of the financial group is to offer banking services in French-speaking Africa. In March 2016 the group appointed Alfredo Sáenz Abad as president of the bank.

O’Hara Administration 

Betancourt leads the O’Hara administration group of international investors. The other key executive of the group as portfolio manager and director is Orlando J. Alvarado.

The group currently holds 19.95% of Pacific Exploration & Production Corporation shares. In August 2016, O’Hara together with the Mexican investor Fernando Chico Pardo presented a restructuring bid for Pacific worth $575 million.

Hawkers 
As of October 2016 O’Hara together with the founders of the Spanish social network Tuenti, Felix Ruiz and Hugo Arévalo led a financing round of 50 million euros for the Spanish sunglasses startup company Hawkers. In November 2016 Hawkers appointed Alejandro Betancourt as its new president.

Betancourt is currently the largest shareholder of Hawkers. He has overseen the company’s new plan for expansion as well as its adjustment to the recession in Spain.

Auro 
Betancourt participated as a notable shareholder in the founding of Auro New Transport, a Vehicle for hire company in Spain. In November 2022, Uber and Cabify placed competitive bids of around 200 million euros to buy the company.

References

External links
 Derwick Associates website; accessed 2 April 2014.
 Alejandro Betancourt official website; accessed 2 April 2014.

1980 births
Living people
People from Caracas
Suffolk University alumni
Venezuelan businesspeople
Date of birth missing (living people)
Corruption in Venezuela